Redtop is an unincorporated community in Dallas County, Missouri, United States.

Redtop is part of the Springfield, Missouri Metropolitan Statistical Area.

History
A post office was established in 1889 or earlier, and was named "Cassity" after the postmaster, T.N. Cassity.  Because the name was similar to "Cassidy", a post office in southern Missouri, the name was changed to "Marmaduke", after Confederate general John S. Marmaduke.  That name was too long for the postal ring or stamp, and again needed to be changed.  Cassity's wife suggested "redtop", which was a type of grass (Agrostis gigantea) which grew in a large field behind the store in which the office was housed, and which had a reddish color when ripe.

The post office was later moved to U.S. Route 65.

References

Unincorporated communities in Dallas County, Missouri
Springfield metropolitan area, Missouri
Unincorporated communities in Missouri